This is a list of dukes of Bosnia, containing duke, knez, vlasteličić, and other minor titles of the Medieval Bosnia.

Duke

Knez

Others

See also
List of grand dukes of Bosnia
List of rulers of Bosnia
List of Bosnian consorts

References

Sources

d

Bosnia